The Palace of Congresses is a venue in Tirana, Albania, where numerous multi-genre concerts, exhibition, festivals, competitions and other events are held, including the annual Festivali i Këngës and Kënga Magjike and the Tirana Book Fair.

It was built during the late communist era to host the Congresses of Albanian Labour Party and other official activities. Today, the palace is used as a venue for conferences, festivals, exhibitions, ceremonies, concerts and more. It currently has a capacity of 2,100 seats.

There are three other smaller halls, with a smaller capacity of 150, 280 and 300 people, designed as working environments for different meetings and occasions.

It was designed to harmonize different elements of the local architecture from north to south

References

External links

Buildings and structures in Tirana
Music venues in Albania